Alitash National Park, also called Alatish or Alatash National Park, is a national park in North Gondar Zone, Amhara Region, Ethiopia. It is adjacent to Sudan's Dinder National Park. The national park was founded in 2006.

Geography
Alatish National Park is located 1080 km northwest of Addis Ababa. The area of the park contains mountainous river valleys, open grasslands, deciduous woodlands, and scattered hills along with seasonal rivers. The woodlands of Alatish National Park became a suitable habitat for multiple species of birds.

Wildlife

Flora
Alitash National Park encompasses seasonal wetlands, riverine ecosystems, wooded grasslands, and diverse woodlands.

Fauna 
Alitash National Park hosts 37 mammal species including African elephant, leopard, greater kudu and lesser kudu. Seven species of reptiles include Egyptian cobra, black mamba, Nile monitor and rock python are found within the ecosystem.

In 2016, a population of about 200 lions was discovered in the protected area that is thought to be of Central African origin.

The 204 bird species present in Alitash National Park include parrots, eagles, plovers, herons, egrets, ibises, buzzards, vultures and cormorants, which are widespread in seasonal woodland areas.

References

External links 
Alatish National Park - Gatekeeper of The Sahara Desert

National parks of Ethiopia
Protected areas of Amhara Region
Protected areas established in 2006
2006 establishments in Ethiopia
North Gondar Zone